Prehistoric settlement of the British Isles refers to the earliest establishment and expansion of human settlements in locations in the British Isles.

These include:

 Neolithic British Isles
 Prehistoric Britain
 Bronze Age Britain
 British Iron Age
 Prehistoric Ireland
 Prehistoric Scotland
 Prehistoric Orkney
 Prehistoric Wales